Tom Kempers and Daniel Orsanic were the defending champions, but Kempers did not compete this year. Orsanic teamed up with Tomás Carbonell and lost in the second round to Jürgen Melzer and Alexander Peya.

Chris Haggard and Peter Nyborg won the title by defeating Álex Calatrava and Dušan Vemić 6–3, 6–7(4–7), 7–6(7–4) in the final.

Seeds
All seeds received a bye to the second round.

Draw

Finals

Top half

Bottom half

References

External links
 Official results archive (ATP)
 Official results archive (ITF)

Doubles
Austrian Open Kitzbühel